The Bungay River is a short river in southeastern Massachusetts that is a tributary of the Ten Mile River.

It flows south through Greenwood Lake and through North Attleboro and Attleboro. It enters the Ten Mile River in Attleboro and ultimately empties into Narragansett Bay.

According to published judgments by the Massachusetts Executive Office of Environmental Affairs, the river flows through the best red maple swamp in Massachusetts and provides some of the best canoeing across the state. It and surrounding wetlands are under study as wildlife preservation areas.

Tributaries
The West Branch and Black Brook are the only named tributaries, though there are many unnamed streams that also feed it.

Bungay Lake
Bungay Lake (Greenwood Lake on federal maps) is a  private lake in North Attleboro and Mansfield. It was first formed by a dam on the Bungay River in the 18th century near its confluence with the West Branch. It is classified as class A water.

References

External links 
 USGS article by M.A. Horn
 Massachusetts Executive Office of Environmental Affairs
 Environmental Protection Agency
 Bungay Lake Associates 

Rivers of Bristol County, Massachusetts
Rivers of Massachusetts
Foxborough, Massachusetts
North Attleborough, Massachusetts
Attleboro, Massachusetts
Tributaries of Providence River